The 2008 congressional elections in West Virginia was held on November 4, 2008, to determine who would represent the state of West Virginia in the United States House of Representatives. Representatives are elected for two-year terms; whoever is elected will serve in the 111th Congress from January 4, 2009, until January 3, 2011. The election coincided with the 2008 U.S. presidential election.

West Virginia has three seats in the House, apportioned according to the 2000 United States Census. Its 2007–2008 congressional delegation consisted of two Democrats and one Republican.  , this is the last time that Democrats won a majority of congressional districts from West Virginia.

Overview

District 1

Democratic incumbent Alan Mollohan ran unopposed. CQ Politics ranked the race as 'Safe Democrat'.

District 2

Republican incumbent Shelley Moore Capito (campaign website) won against Democratic nominee Anne Barth (campaign website), a longtime former aide to U.S. Senator Robert Byrd. CQ Politics ranked the race 'Leans Republican'. The Rothenberg Political Report considered it 'Republican Favored'. The Cook Political Report considered it 'Likely Republican'.

In 2006, Capito was reelected with 57%, a solid margin, but not a sign of political security. She faced a potentially difficult challenge from state Sen. John Unger (D), but Unger surprised many when he dropped out of the race.

District 3

Democratic incumbent Nick Rahall was challenged by Republican Marty Gearheart. CQ Politics ranked the race as 'Safe Democrat'.

References

External links
Elections at the West Virginia Secretary of State
U.S. Congress candidates for West Virginia at Project Vote Smart
Campaign contributions for West Virginia congressional races from OpenSecrets

2008
West Virginia
United States House of Representatives